Adamle is a surname. Notable people with the surname include:

 Tony Adamle (1924–2000), American football running back
 Mike Adamle (born 1949), American football running back and sports broadcaster, son of Tony

See also
 Adame